Lukáš Hejda (born 9 March 1990) is a Czech professional footballer who plays as a defender for FC Viktoria Plzeň.

Career statistics 
As of 1 June 2015

References

External links
 
 
 

1990 births
Living people
Czech footballers
Czech Republic youth international footballers
Czech Republic under-21 international footballers
Czech First League players
AC Sparta Prague players
FK Jablonec players
1. FK Příbram players
FC Viktoria Plzeň players
People from Bílovec
Czech Republic international footballers
Association football defenders
Sportspeople from the Moravian-Silesian Region